PooPrints is a commercial service that uses DNA profiling of feces to assist with pet waste management. DNA is first collected by a cheek swab, and registered online at the DNA World Pet Registry.

According to a 2012 report from Minnesota station WCCO-TV, it is "a first of its kind company".

It is a division of BioPet Laboratories, located in Knoxville, Tennessee.

It was started in 2008.

References

Biotechnology companies established in 2008
Feces
Companies based in Knoxville, Tennessee
2008 establishments in Tennessee